Josef Skřivan (10 August 1902 – 4 November 1942) was a Czech actor. He was active in theatre and film between 1920 and 1937. A resistance member, he was arrested by the Gestapo in October 1941 and was executed at Auschwitz concentration camp in 1942.

Select filmography
Jménem Jeho Veličenstva (1928)
Pudr a benzin (1931)
Peníze nebo život (1932)
Hej rup (1934)
Ztratila se Bílá paní (1937)

References

External links

1902 births
1942 deaths
Male actors from Prague
Czech male stage actors
Czech male film actors
20th-century Czech male actors
Czech resistance members
Czechoslovak civilians killed in World War II
Czech people who died in Auschwitz concentration camp
Czech people executed in Nazi concentration camps
People killed by gas chamber by Nazi Germany
Resistance members who died in Nazi concentration camps